Amber Planet or Kawkab Anbar' (كوكب عنبر) is a book by author Mohamed Rabie Kotb Aboelsebah. An Arabic novel, From Yousef Rakha, writing about Aboelsebah's book: “Kawkab ‘Anbar is the story of the eponymous, little known library (named after its original owner’s wife), a public endowment in Abbassiya on the verge of being demolished to make way for a new underground Metro line. It is told by Shahir, the endowments official who is sent there on a month-long assignment to put together a report on the library – a perfunctory, routine procedure intended to facilitate the foregone conclusion of its demolition by establishing that, all things considered, there is no reason for it to remain standing.”

References

Arabic-language novels